Kitukutwe is a neighborhood in Kira Municipality, Kyaddondo County, Wakiso District, in Central Uganda.

Location
Kitukutwe is bordered by Nakasajja to the north, Kasaayi (in Mukono District) to the east, and Nsasa to the south. Kigulu and Bulindo lie to the southwest, and Nakweero and Kimwanyi lie to the northwest. The coordinates of Kitukutwe are:0° 27' 0.00"N, 32° 40' 12.00"E (Latitude:0.45000; Longitude:32.67000).

Overview
Prior to 2001, Kitukutwe was a residential and farming village. In 2001, a law was passed, incorporating the village into the newly created Kira Municipality, the second largest urban center in Uganda, with a population of 313,761 according to the 2014 national census. During the 21st Century Kitukutwe has developed into a middle-class residential neighbourhood, with planned housing developments and large private farms and ranches. Kitukutwe is connected to the national power grid and to the water pipeline of the National Water and Sewerage Corporation.

Points of interest
These are some of the points of interest in or near Kitukutwe:
 Riverside Acres Kitukutwe Housing Estate - A planned residential development by Riverside Acres Limited, a private real estate development company.
 Jomayi Kigulu Housing Estate - A planned residential development by Jomayi Estates Limited, a private real estate development company. Housing estate located in nearby Kigulu.
 Akright Nsasa Housing Estate - A planned residential development by Akright Projects Limited, a private real estate development company. Housing estate located in nearby Nsasa Village.

See also
 Kigulu
 Nsasa
 Bulindo
 Kitikifumba
 Kira Municipality

External links
  Location of Kitukutwe At Google Maps

References

Kira Town
Populated places in Central Region, Uganda
Cities in the Great Rift Valley